The Tulane School of Architecture is the school of architecture at Tulane University in New Orleans, Louisiana. The school has a student body of approximately 442 students.

The school is home to 5 academic programs (Architecture, Design, Historic Preservation, Real Estate Development, and Social Innovation and Social Entrepreneurship), which offer a total of 8 different undergraduate and graduate degrees and 5 undergraduate minors and 3 graduate certificates - many of which can be combined with other academic programs at Tulane University.

Degree paths for students lead to a 5-year professional Master of Architecture, a 4-year Bachelor of Science in Architecture, a -year professional Master of Architecture intended for those holding undergraduate degrees outside of architecture, a 2-year Master of Architecture program for pre-professional degree holders with substantial architectural education, as well as the post-professional Master of Science in Architectural Research and Design. Additionally, the school has an undergraduate Bachelor of Arts in Design and Bachelor of Science in Real Estate. Graduate programs also include a Master of Science in Historic Preservation (MSHP) and a Master of Sustainable Real Estate Development (MSRED). It also offers dual degree programs, undergraduate minors and certificates in preservation studies and sustainable real estate development, and an undergraduate minor in social innovation and social entrepreneurship (SISE).

History

In 1894, Tulane University offered the first courses in architecture leading to a degree in architectural engineering under professor William Woodward. At this time, only about a dozen schools of architecture had been established in the United States. A full four-year professional curriculum in architecture, leading to the bachelor's degree, was established in the College of Technology (Engineering) in the 1907–1908 academic year. In 1912, Professor Nathaniel Cortlandt Curtis was appointed head of the newly independent Architecture Department; his successors were Professor John Herndon
Thompson in 1921 and Professor Buford L. Pickens in 1946.

At the conclusion of the Second World War, the faculty and enrollment increased to accommodate returning veterans. The school continued to grow throughout the next two decades. John Ekin Dinwiddie was appointed dean of the School of Architecture in 1953; Professor John William Lawrence succeeded him in 1960. In 1971, the School of Architecture renovated and moved into its present facility, the Richardson Memorial Building, and experienced another increase in enrollment that continued throughout the 1970s. Professor William Kay Turner became the dean in 1972, and in 1975 a small graduate program was initiated, offering a course of study leading to the Master of Architecture II as a second professional degree. In 1981, after beginning his service as dean the previous year, Professor
Ronald Coulter Filson established the Architectural Coalition for professional research and practice by faculty and students. Professor Donna V. Robertson succeeded Dean Filson in 1992.
Upon the resignation of Dean Robertson in 1996, Professor Donald F. Gatzke was appointed acting dean. After a year-long search, Dean Gatzke was appointed dean in 1997. In October 2004 Reed Kroloff was appointed dean of the School after the departure of Dean Gatzke. Dean Emeritus Filson served as interim dean during the search.

In the summer of 1990, the School began a program offering a Master of Architecture I (now named Master of Architecture) as a first professional degree for students with undergraduate degrees in other disciplines. The program awarded its first degrees in 1993 and was granted accreditation in 1994. In the fall of 1997, the School initiated a Masters in Preservation Studies Program (now named Master of Science in Historic Preservation) with a first-time enrollment of ten students. Also in 1997, a supplemental Certificate in Preservation Studies was offered to undergraduates for the first time. The School began in 1999 offering a five-year Master of Architecture (now named Bachelor of Architecture) to students who have not earned a bachelor's degree. In 2019, the School of Architecture teamed up with Tulane's A.B. Freeman School of Business to launch a dual degree program where graduate students simultaneously earn the Master of Business Administration (MBA) and the Master of Sustainable Real Estate Development (MSRED), the first and only such pairing in the nation.

URBANbuild and the Albert and Tina Small Center for Collaborative Design
After the devastation of New Orleans following hurricanes Katrina and Rita in 2005, the school became an active partner in the reconstruction of the city. This work was consolidated into two programs/centers at Tulane School of Architecture: URBANbuild and the Albert and Tina Small Center for Collaborative Design (originally named the Tulane City Center).

URBANbuild is a design/build program in which teams of students take on the design and construction of prototypical homes for New Orleans’ neighborhoods. URBANbuild’s partners in the development of these homes have been a number of non-profit community partners such as Neighborhood Housing Services of New Orleans (NHS), the Make It Right Organization of New Orleans (MIR), and Harmony Neighborhood development.

The Small Center houses the School of Architecture's urban research and outreach programs. Programs of the Small Center vary over time, but consistently involve nonprofit partners that exhibit a need for design solutions, whether visioning projects or built works. The Small Center won a Silver Medal from the Rudy Bruner Award for Urban Excellence in 2019 and a Provost’s Award for Excellence in Equity, Diversity, and Inclusion in 2021. Recent and notable programs and projects created through the Small Center include Parisite Skate Park, Grow Dat Youth Farm, Community Book Center Renovation, Loop NOLA Pavilion, Prisoner's Apothecarts, Sugar Roots Farm Outdoor Classroom.

Notable alumni
Nathaniel C. Curtis, Jr., and Arthur Q. Davis, of the firm Curtis and Davis, Architects of Louisiana Superdome, Embassy of the United States in Saigon, South Vietnam.
Robert Ivy, Chief Executive Officer of the American Institute of Architects
A. Hays Town, architect
Samuel Wilson, Jr., preservation architect
Bernard Lemann, architectural historian
Albert C. Ledner, architect
Moise H. Goldstein Sr., architect
Wellington "Duke" Reiter, AR '81, president, School of the Art Institute of Chicago
Jing Liu, architect, co-founder of the award-winning design firm SO – IL

Notable faculty
Iñaki Alday, Dean and Richard Koch Chair of Architecture; Founder of Alday Jover arquitectura y paisaje; advisor to the United Nations as an expert on the urban planning of rivers and deltas 
Errol Barron, of the firm Barron + Toups, architects of the Ogden Museum of Southern Art
Richard Campanella, author, geographer, definitive researcher on New Orleans historic geographic and urban landscape
Charles R. Colbert, architect of the Phillis Wheatley Elementary School, New Orleans
Ammar Eloueini, architect, creator of unique chair design, CoReFab#116, that is in the permanent collection of the Museum of Modern Art in New York City
Jesse Keenan, one of the nation's leading scholars on climate change and the built environment
Ronald Filson, FAIA, architect of the renovation of the Piazza d'Italia
Reed Kroloff, former dean, former editor of Architecture magazine
Kenneth A. Schwartz, FAIA, former dean (2008-2018), current Professor of Architecture, Michael Sacks Chair in Civic Engagement and Social Entrepreneurship, Director of Phyllis Taylor Center for Social Innovation and Design Thinking
Judith Kinnard, FAIA, former President-elect NAAB and past president of ACSA

Lectures, Events and Honors

The John W. Lawrence Memorial Lecture

Each year an architect or scholar is invited to the School of Architecture to deliver a special lecture in honor of its late Dean, John W. Lawrence. Lawrence lecturers have included Louis I. Kahn, Charles Willard Moore, Arata Isozaki, Mario Gandelsonas, Peter Eisenman, Rem Koolhaas, Bernard Tschumi, and Greg Lynn.

Other Activities

The School also sponsors and supports traveling fellowships for students, such as the Lawrence, Class of 1973 and Goldstein Fellowships. The Architecture Student Government organizes an annual all-school Design Symposium, inviting guest lectures and hosting workshops. The school's student-run publication The Charrette won a 2020 Center for Architecture Haskell Award for Student Journals.

See also
Kenneth A. Schwartz

References

Architecture
Architecture schools in Louisiana
Educational institutions established in 1894
1894 establishments in Louisiana